Budiměřice is a municipality and village in Nymburk District in the Central Bohemian Region of the Czech Republic. It has about 600 inhabitants.

Administrative parts
Villages of Rašovice and Šlotava are administrative parts of Budiměřice.

References

Villages in Nymburk District